Muchinga may refer to:
Muchinga (constituency), a constituency of the National Assembly of Zambia
Muchinga Province, a province of Zambia